Folke Henry Jonsson  (9 June 1904 in Ängelholm Sweden - 7 December 1981 in Sollentuna) was a Swedish opera singer who sang leading bass roles primarily at the Royal Swedish Opera and in other Scandinavian opera houses for many years. He also appeared as one of the priests in Ingmar Bergman's film The Magic Flute (Trollflöjten) and as the Herald in Roberto Rossellini's film Giovanna d'Arco al rogo.

In 1945 he sang Old Florio in the premiere of Rosenberg's opera Lycksalighetens ö in Stockholm.

Recordings of some of Jonsson's live performances with the Royal Swedish Opera can be heard on Mozart at the Royal Swedish Opera 1952-1967 Vol. 6, (Caprice Records 22059); Birgit Nilsson: Rarities (Gala  624); and Set Svanholm Live (Preiser Records 90332).

Folke Jonsson was the grandfather of television presenter Ulrika Jonsson.

References

Birgitta Steene, Ingmar Bergman: A Reference Guide, Amsterdam University Press, 2005, 
Birgit Nilsson, La Nilsson: My Life in Opera, Northeastern University Press, 2007,  
Tag Gallagher, The Adventures of Roberto Rossellini: His Life And Films, Da Capo Press, 1998, 
This article also incorporates material from the article Folke Jonsson in the Swedish Wikipedia.

1904 births
1981 deaths
People from Ängelholm Municipality
Operatic basses
20th-century Swedish male  opera singers